Alexander Doyle (1857–1922) was an American sculptor.

Doyle was born in Steubenville, Ohio, and spent his youth in Louisville (Kentucky) and St. Louis (Missouri) before going to Italy to study sculpture in Bergamo, Rome, and Florence, studying with Giovanni Duprè, Carlo Nicoli and Fernando Pelliccia.

After returning to the United States he settled in New York City and became one of the most prominent sculptors of the era. There are three statues by Doyle in National Statuary Hall in Washington, D.C.: Thomas Hart Benton (Thomas Hart Benton), Francis Preston Blair, Jr. (Francis Preston Blair Jr.) and John E. Kenna (John E. Kenna).

Doyle became a sculptor of marble and bronze monuments of historical figures including Civil War heroes and other prominent persons. He studied in Italy at the National Academies at Carrara, Rome, and Florence and was a member of the Royal Raphael Academy. His work can be found throughout the United States including in Washington, D.C., Missouri, Alabama, New York, Ohio, Indiana, Georgia, and Mississippi.

In New Orleans, where he was active in 1882 and 1883, he created a trio of important sculptures of Confederate States Army generals. These are: the city's iconic figure of General Robert E. Lee at Lee Circle, dedicated in 1884 and removed by Mayor Mitch Landrieu on May 19, 2017; the massive bronze General Beauregard Equestrian Statue at the entrance to City Park (1915), removed on May 16 of 2017 and placed in a city junk yard; and the bronze statue of General Albert Sydney Johnston atop the Army of the Tennessee cenotaph in Metairie Cemetery (1887). According to Leonard V. Huber, author of New Orleans Architecture: The Cemeteries,  Doyle's finest work is "Calling the Roll" (1885), a marble sculpture of an unknown Confederate soldier. "Calling the Roll" stands before the General Johnston bronze monument in Metairie Cemetery.

A Doyle marble statue of Margaret Haughery, a New Orleans woman who devoted her life to the poor, was erected in 1889, the first monument to honor a female philanthropist in the United States.

The "Alexander Doyle Papers, 1852-1937" are located in the Smithsonian Institution’s Archives of American Art in Washington D.C.

Partial list of works

References

External links

Biography on Rootsweb

1857 births
1922 deaths
People from Steubenville, Ohio
20th-century American sculptors
19th-century American sculptors
American male sculptors
19th-century American male artists
20th-century American male artists